Denis Burke may refer to:

 Denis Burke (Irish politician) (1904–1971), Irish politician, senator (1948–1961)
 Denis Burke (Australian politician) (born 1948), Australian politician, Chief Minister of the Northern Territory (1999–2001)

See also 
 Dennis K. Burke (born 1962), U.S. Attorney for the District of Arizona (2009–2011)